John Burton (1760–1838) was a Baptist minister in Nova Scotia and was one of the first to integrate black and white Nova Scotians into the same congregation. David George was the first Baptist minister. In 1811, Burton's church had 33 members, the majority of whom were free blacks from Halifax and the neighbouring settlements of Preston and Hammonds Plains.

According to historian Stephen Davidson, the blacks were "shunned, or merely tolerated, by the rest of Christian Halifax, the blacks were from the first warmly received in the Baptist Church. Burton became known as "an apostle to the coloured people" and would often be sent out by the Baptist association on missionary visits to the black communities surrounding Halifax. He was the mentor of Richard Preston.

See also
New Horizons Baptist Church
Black Nova Scotians

References

Further reading
 Robin W. Winks, The Blacks in Canada: A History, 2nd ed. (Montreal: McGill-Queens University Press, 1997)
 Pearleen Oliver, A Brief History of the Coloured Baptists of Nova Scotia (Halifax, N.S.: s.n., 1953).
 Stephen Davidson, "Leaders of the Black Baptists of Nova Scotia 1782-1832" (B.A. Honours thesis, Acadia University, 1975

1760 births
1838 deaths
People from Halifax, Nova Scotia
19th-century Canadian Baptist ministers
Canadian activists